The Aero Ae 01 was a Czechoslovakian military trainer biplane built in 1919 and was Aero's first attempt to modify one of the aircraft designs they had been manufacturing under licence during World War I, the Hansa-Brandenburg B.I. The project was originally designated as Ae 10, but later re-designated to Ae 01. The army operated the aircraft under designation A-1.

Specifications (Ae 01)

Operators
  - Czechoslovak Air Force

See also

References 

1910s Czechoslovakian military trainer aircraft
Ae01
Biplanes
Single-engined tractor aircraft
Aircraft first flown in 1919